The Las Vegas Convention Center (commonly referred to as LVCC) is a convention center in Winchester, Nevada. It is owned and operated by the Las Vegas Convention and Visitors Authority.

As one of the largest convention centers in the world, it has  of exhibit space and hosts shows with an estimated 200,000 participants. The Conexpo-Con/Agg construction trade show in 2008 used the most space, . The LVCC is adjacent to the Westgate Las Vegas Resort & Casino and the Renaissance Las Vegas Hotel and is accessible from the Las Vegas Monorail at the Convention Center station.

History
In the 1950s, the Las Vegas city and county leaders recognized the need for a convention facility. The initial goal was to increase the occupancy rates of hotels during low tourist months. Leaders chose a site one block east of the Las Vegas Strip at the site of the Las Vegas Park Speedway, a failed horse and automobile racing facility from the early 1950s. A 6,300 capacity, silver-domed rotunda with an adjoining  exhibition hall opened in April 1959.  It hosted The Beatles on August 20, 1964.

The Convention Center was also the site of several major professional boxing fights in the 1960s: Gene Fullmer versus Sugar Ray Robinson on March 4, 1961; Fulmer versus Benny Paret on December 9, 1961; Sonny Liston versus Floyd Patterson on July 22, 1963; and Muhammad Ali versus Floyd Patterson on November 22, 1965.

Led Zeppelin was supposed to perform at the convention center on April 19, 1970, capping the final show of their Spring 1970 North American Tour, but the gig was cancelled due to lead singer Robert Plant falling ill the previous night.

Also, the venue was home to the UNLV Runnin' Rebels men's basketball team from 1966 to 1982. It was demolished in 1990, creating space for expansion. Upon completion, there was vastly more space , including  for exhibitors, making it one of the largest single-level facilities in the world.

The Las Vegas Convention Center Act of 1971 authorized the use of $7 million to rebuild, remodel or expand the center. By 1985, the center had held 7,000 conventions since its opening.

The Convention Center dome hosted two Billy Graham Crusades between 1978 and 1980.

On December 19, 1993, the draw for the 1994 FIFA World Cup was held at the building.

In 1993, the Las Vegas Convention and Visitors Authority (LVCVA) purchased the defunct Landmark hotel-casino, which was across from the convention center. LVCVA demolished the resort in 1995 to develop additional parking on the site for convention guests.

While it functioned, COMDEX was the most attended trade show in the United States, with over 200,000 attendees on several occasions.

In 2000, early planning began for another expansion of the center. The new $150 million South Hall was topped out on February 20, 2001. Upon completion in 2004, it crossed a major roadway (Desert Inn Road), with four bridges connecting the facilities.

As of 2009, the Consumer Electronics Show is the most attended annual trade show at this location, with more than 140,000 attendees.

In 2018, the Las Vegas Convention Center released plans to undergo yet another $890 million expansion, the 14th in its history. The expansion intended to increase the center's meeting space and improve the building's overall design. Updates would feature the latest in technology, as well as to connect the Convention Center to the Las Vegas Strip. The authority has announced plans to expand the direction of the LVCC by creating a Las Vegas Global Business District. Those plans resulted in the announcement for the acquisition of the Riviera in February 2015 for $182.5 million.

Work was underway on the expansion in 2019 on land previously occupied by the Landmark and Riviera resorts. The expansion was complete as of 2021.

Construction of an underground "Loop" people mover by The Boring Company began in late 2019 to reduce walking times within the Center. Twin tunnels opened in June 2021 at a cost of $53 million with three stations 40 feet below the surface, shuttling passengers in conventional, human-driven Tesla vehicles. While the long-term goal of the system is to have autonomous vehicles operating at higher speeds, as of May 2021 no date has been set for this.

In popular culture
A variety of shows have been taped in the convention center including Food Network specials and the 2009 Jeopardy! Tournament of Champions. Numerous conventions produce live shows in the facility.

In The Boss Baby, the Forever puppies got launched here via Puppyco's in-house built rocket but failed to deliver.

References

External links
 
 

1959 establishments in Nevada
Buildings and structures in Winchester, Nevada
Convention centers in the Las Vegas Valley
Defunct college basketball venues in the United States
Event venues established in 1959
Government buildings completed in 1959
Sports venues in Las Vegas
Boxing venues in Las Vegas
Indoor arenas in Las Vegas
UNLV Runnin' Rebels basketball
Continental Basketball Association venues